Dasher is a town in Lowndes County, Georgia, United States. The population was 912 at the 2010 census, up from 834 at the 2000 census.

History
Dasher was established as a station on the route of the newly completed Georgia Southern and Florida Railway in 1889 at the residence of V. F. Dasher. The Georgia General Assembly incorporated Dasher in 1968.

Geography

Dasher is located in southeastern Lowndes County at  (30.745391, -83.222919). U.S. Route 41 passes through the town, leading northwest  to Valdosta, the county seat, and southeast  to Lake Park.

Demographics

As of the census of 2000, there were 834 people, 298 households, and 230 families residing in the town. The racial makeup of the town was 93.65% White, 2.64% African American, 0.96% Native American, 0.96% Asian, 0.12% Pacific Islander, 0.36% from other races, and 1.32% from two or more races. Hispanic or Latino of any race were 2.28% of the population.

There were 298 households, out of which 35.6% had children under the age of 18 living with them, 65.4% were married couples living together, 7.4% had a female householder with no husband present, and 22.5% were non-families. 19.5% of all households were made up of individuals, and 8.7% had someone living alone who was 65 years of age or older.  The average household size was 2.70 and the average family size was 3.11.

In the town, the population was spread out, with 29.0% under the age of 18, 7.3% from 18 to 24, 25.7% from 25 to 44, 26.9% from 45 to 64, and 11.2% who were 65 years of age or older.  The median age was 37 years. For every 100 females, there were 96.7 males.  For every 100 females age 18 and over, there were 97.3 males.

The median income for a household in the town was $46,563, and the median income for a family was $53,750. Males had a median income of $34,375 versus $21,591 for females. The per capita income for the town was $18,168.  About 3.4% of families and 6.1% of the population were below the poverty line, including 8.0% of those under age 18 and 5.4% of those age 65 or over.

References

External links
Official website

Towns in Lowndes County, Georgia
Towns in Georgia (U.S. state)
Valdosta metropolitan area